Kuthukku Pathu (transl. Ten per bang)  is a Indian Tamil-language Comedy Drama web series produced as an Original for Aha Tamil, directed by Vijay Varadharaj. Produced by D Company the series stars Sha Ra, Vijay Varadharaj, Abdool Lee, Samyuktha Shanmuganathan, Bose Venkat and Aadukalam Naren. The series comprised seven episodes and was released on Aha Tamil on 13 May 2022.

Synopsis
The story about a day of absurd chaos in the city of Chennai caused by youthful exuberance and comradeship. The consequences of an innocent love story extends from a hand fight and ends to a murder in this dark humour led story.

Cast
 Sha Ra
 Vijay Varadharaj as Rangabashyam
 Abdool Lee
 Samyuktha Shanmuganathan
 Bose Venkat
 Aadukalam Naren
 R. Badree as Fakir
 Augustin as Medavakkam Augustin
 Sengi Velu
 Divagar
 Dhileepan

Episodes

References

External links 
 
 Kuthukku Pathu at Aha Tamil

Tamil-language web series
2022 Tamil-language television series debuts
Aha (streaming service) original programming
Tamil-language comedy television series